Santa Marinella is a comune (municipality) in the Metropolitan City of Rome in the Italian region Lazio, located about  northwest of Rome.

It includes the beach resort of Santa Severa (the ancient Pyrgi), and a medieval castle.

History

In antiquity, Santa Marinella was the site of Punicum, the Etruscan port which served the city of Caere. 
Punicum was identified in the Peutinger Table, in which it is on the Via Aurelia 9km N of Pyrgi. The area had several scattered settlements in Etruscan times.

It was also later known as Aquae Caeretanae, a Roman resort and site of many opulent villas under the Empire.

There was a Sanctuary of Minerva overlooking the Punto della Vipera north of S. Marinella, finds from which are in the museum together with marble sculptures from the nearby villas, including an Apollo of Hellenistic type.

Climate

Culture 
Actress Ingrid Bergman and director Roberto Rossellini had a villa here.
The gypsy punk band, Gogol Bordello also have a song titled "Santa Marinella" on their 2005 album Gypsy Punks: Underdog World Strike about Eugene Hutz's time in Santa Marinella as he tried to gain immigration to America.

The commune is known for its "Wheels of Immigration" - a pretzel-like snack consumed by Russian Jewish immigrants who temporarily settled there in the late 1980s on their way to United States or Israel.

Twin towns - Sister Cities 
 Limanu, Romania

See also
Landscape with the Port of Santa Marinella

References

External links

Cities and towns in Lazio
Roman sites in Lazio
Archaeological sites in Italy